An automated efficiency model (AEM) is a mathematical model that estimates a real estate property’s efficiency (in terms of energy, commuting, etc) by using details specific to the property which are available publicly and/or housing characteristics which are aggregated over a given area such as a zip code. AEMs have some similarities to an automated valuation model (AVM) in terms of concept, advantages and disadvantages.

AEMs calculate specific efficiencies such as location, water, energy or solar efficiency. The Council of Multiple Listing Services defines an AEM as, “any algorithm or scoring model that estimates the [efficiency] of a home without an on-site inspection. They are similar to Automated Valuation Models (AVMs), but are more reliant on public data such as square footage...and estimated energy usage.”

Most AEMs calculate a property’s selected efficiency by analyzing available public information and may also apply proprietary data or formulas, and allow for a user such as a home owner to make additional inputs.  Housing characteristics such as age of the home or square footage may be obtained by data providers such as those on this list of online real estate databases or a similar offerings. Estimates of energy usage may be available from published sources such as through the Residential Energy Consumption Survey by the Energy Information Administration.

Examples of use 
By design, the AEM score output is provided as a preliminary comparison tool so the score of one property may be compared to other homes, against an average score for the area, etc. Primary users may vary from buyers and sellers to real estate agents and appraisers as they complete relevant comparisons.  For example, REColorado, the multiple listing service covering the Denver metro area, presents a UtilityScore widget on homes for sale.  Zillow publishes a Sun Number score on the home fact sheet so website visitors can compare the solar energy potential of prospective properties. Trulia has published a report using automated estimates from UtilityScore to present water, natural gas and electric rates into a single price per square foot by zip code.

Beyond usage for consumer preliminary comparisons, usage of AEMs varies by industry.  AEMs may also be used by solar installers, home improvement contractors, efficiency inspectors, and mortgage lenders.

In the photovoltaics industry, installers use Sun Number to reduce the soft costs associated with motivating consumers to invest in solar systems and in recording property specifications to create quotes. The U.S. Department of Energy has found that Sun Number eliminates 7–10 days from the quotation process when solar suitability is determined digitally and eliminates the need for an onsite inspection.

AEMs have been used in the mortgage industry to support a niche loan product called a Location Efficient Mortgage (LEM). During underwriting, an AEM such as the H+T Affordability Index is used to calculate the location efficient value

According to National Mortgage Professional Magazine AEMs may one day be incorporated into loan underwriting as well, “Since utilities are as big or bigger part of home expenses than even real estate taxes, we may see [estimated utility usage] begin to be factored into underwriting.”

Methodology 
AEMs generate a score for a specific property based on both publicly available housing characteristics about the subject property as well as mathematical modeling. AEMs are technology-driven scores without an onsite inspection or human assessment. For more accurate information unique to a specific property an onsite inspection such as an energy audit is required.

Detailed information on the data accessed to calculate an AEM, the modeling formulas and algorithms are generally not published.  A summary of general information is listed in the table below:

Advantages 
As shown in the section above, AEMs tend to rely on public information rather than information which is private to the resident such as actual utility bills. Utility bills can vary based on the occupancy and personal property within a structure.  The public information used in AEMs is relatively static as it is focused on details of the structure, location and/or mechanical systems and therefore tends to reflect the real property transferred during a real estate transaction.

According to the Council of Multiple Listing Services advantages are, “AEMs provide consumers with a quick comparison of all properties across a specified market. Since most focus on the attached systems and structure, they are only meant to reflect the efficiency of the real property.”

Disadvantages 
According to the Council of Multiple Listing Services advantages are, “AEMs are dependent on data used, the assumptions made, and the model methodology. Since models and methodologies differ and no on-site inspections are performed, accuracy may vary among scoring systems.”

References 

Mathematical modeling